St. Paisius Orthodox Monastery is an Eastern Orthodox Christian women’s coenobitic community in Safford, Arizona which follows the traditional rule of Serbian monastic life. The monastery is situated in the High Sonoran Desert at the base of Mount Graham. The English-speaking monastery is now also under the jurisdictions of Kyrill of the Western American Diocese of the Russian Orthodox Church Outside of Russia (ROCOR). It has 320 acres of land, making it the fifth largest monastery among the 80 American Orthodox Christian monasteries.

History
The monastery was founded in 1993 and is dedicated to St. Paisius Velichkovsky, who dedicated his life to collecting and translating the texts of the Philokalia as a means of preserving the teachings of the Holy Fathers on the hesychastic way of life.

Since 1995, the sisterhood has welcomed teenage girls who wish to live and study at the monastery. The monastery home school is dedicated to the Protection of the Theotokos. The sisters tutor the girls in their studies and offer supplementary classes. Some of the students have chosen to remain as nuns in the monastery, while others have married and started their own families.

An Orthodox cemetery was established in 2004.

Monastery life
The sisterhood is currently composed of about twenty sisters. There is a daily Divine Liturgy in the monastery, and the daily cycle of services is conducted primarily in English.

To support themselves, the sisters publish spiritual texts, make prayer ropes, and offer to over 1000 guests who visit the monastery each year a fully stocked bookstore. They also labor in cultivating the earth and tending the monastery’s flock of purebred milk goats and other animals in order to be as self-sufficient as possible.

See also
 Serbian Americans
 Serbs in Canada
 Serbs in South America
 Saint Sava Serbian Orthodox Monastery and Seminary
 New Gračanica Monastery
 Saint Petka Serbian Orthodox Church
 St. Pachomious Monastery
 Episcopal headquarters of the Serbian Orthodox Eparchy of Western America, located at Saint Steven's Serbian Orthodox Cathedral, Alhambra, California
 Episcopal headquarters of the Serbian Orthodox Eparchy of Buenos Aires and South America, Buenos Aires, Argentina
 Holy Transfiguration Monastery in Milton, Ontario
 St. Xenia Serbian Orthodox Skete
 St. Archangel Michael Skete
 St. Nilus Island Skete
 Saint Herman of Alaska Monastery
 St. Mark Serbian Orthodox Monastery

References

External links
 

Serbian Orthodox monasteries in the United States
Eastern Orthodoxy in Arizona
Christian organizations established in 1993